Yoshihisa Maitani (January 8, 1933 – July 30, 2009) was a designer of cameras for Olympus Corporation.

Maitani joined Olympus in 1956 and worked for them for 40 years. He was involved with the design of many of the company's most well-known cameras, including the Pen and the Pen F half frame cameras, the OM System, the XA and later the Stylus.

References

Japanese designers
Olympus people
1933 births
2009 deaths

The man behind the Olympus OM camera: Yoshihisa Maitani